Greg Eagles (born October 28, 1970) is an American actor. He voiced the Grim Reaper in Cartoon Network's Grim & Evil and its spin-off The Grim Adventures of Billy & Mandy. He also voiced Captain Bob and Sketch Pad on HBO's Canadian-American children's television series Crashbox, Brother 6 and Rokutaro in Afro Samurai, Aku Aku in the Crash Bandicoot video game franchise, and several characters in the Metal Gear Solid games.

Career
Eagles began his acting career in 1993, he made his professional acting debut in the television film Blindsided, were he played a detective. His other live acting credits include How to Live with Your Parents, L.A Heat, NYPD Blue, Pair of Kings, Sister, Sister, Snowfall, Teeth and Blood, The Burning Zone, The Hepburn Effect and The Riches.

He also works extensively as a voice actor, he has provided numerous characters voices in various animated films, anime, television shows and video games. Eagles voiced the Grim Reaper in Cartoon Network's animated series Grim & Evil and its spin-off series, The Grim Adventures of Billy and Mandy. He has also reprised the role in an episode the animated series Codename: Kids Next Door and in the video games, The Grim Adventures of Billy & Mandy, Cartoon Network Universe: FusionFall and Cartoon Network: Punch Time Explosion. In anime, he voiced O'Connor in 8 Man After, Brother 6 and Rokutaro in Afro Samurai and Afro Samurai: Resurrection and Zommari Rureaux, Gantenbainne Mosqueda in Bleach. He also voiced Brother 6 and Rokutaro in the Afro Samurai video game.

Since 2007, he has been the voice of Aku Aku in the Crash Bandicoot video game franchise, beginning with Crash of the Titans. He has since reprised the role in Crash: Mind over Mutant, Crash Bandicoot N. Sane Trilogy, Crash Team Racing Nitro-Fueled and Crash Bandicoot 4: It's About Time. Additionally, he also provided the voices of Jax Briggs, Baraka in Mortal Kombat X as well as Gray Fox, Donald Anderson and various other characters in the Metal Gear Solid franchise.

Eagles is also currently working on an animation project for a television series titled Teapot, about an 11-year-old boy who wishes to be a rapping superstar. He worked on the pilot episode which aired in Nicktoons Network's Random! Cartoons in which he created, produced, written, voice directed and even provided the voice of the titular character. The pilot was storyboarded and art directed by Dahveed Kolodny Nagy (creator of Supa Pirate Booty Hunt) as well as Alex Almaguer, who worked as a writer and storyboard artist on Billy & Mandy, and directed by Robert Alvarez. He is planning to turn the pilot into a full TV-series when it gets picked up, even making an online opening sequence and full theme song. The cartoon short also had a Kickstarter and a now-lost Indiegogo campaign for a video game adaption, Teapot Rap it Up! but the project failed to reach its $2,500 goal.

Filmography

Live-action
 Blindsided – Detective #1
 How to Live with Your Parents – Long Haired Dude
 L.A Heat – Unknown role
 NYPD Blue – Wright Jamison
 Pair of Kings – Tarantula Witch Doctor
 Sister, Sister – Customer #1
 Snowfall – Husky
 Teeth and Blood – Vampire Priest
 The Burning Zone – Zairian
 The Hepburn Effect – Bo Dollar (also writer and producer)
 The Riches – Mark

Animated film
 Batman: The Dark Knight Returns – Mackie, Ben Derrick
 Foodfight! – Hairless Hamster Henchmen
 Billy & Mandy: Wrath of the Spider Queen – Grim
 Billy & Mandy's Big Boogey Adventure – Grim
 Garfield's Fun Fest – Eli
 Garfield Gets Real – Eli
 Garfield's Pet Force – Eli
 Underfist: Halloween Bash – The Grim Reaper

Anime
 8 Man After – O'Connor
 Afro Samurai – Brother 6, Rokutaro (Afro's Father)
 Afro Samurai: Resurrection – Rokutaro
 Bleach – Zommari Rureaux, Gantenbainne Mosqueda

Animation
 Dexter's Laboratory – Tiki, Robo Shark, Capital G
 Invasion America – Philip Stark
 Cow and Chicken – Blind Mud Puddle Johnson, Tongue, Wattle, Sergeant Weenie Arms
 Megas XLR – Cal, Driving Test Guy #1
 Bunnicula – Rusty Bones, Additional voices
 ABC Weekend Specials – Sly Boy 
 The Bold and the Beautiful – Kevin
 Codename: Kids Next Door – The Grim Reaper, Sperg/The Delightful Reaper
 Crashbox – Captain Bob, Sketch Pad
 How I Loved a Macho Boy – Fredrick Masekela
 Lobo – Lobo (episodes 1-5, special)
 Nick's Evil Ways – Frankenstein
 What a Cartoon! — Fix (Ep: Buy One, Get One Free)
 Oh Yeah! Cartoons — Stinger, Additional voices
 Random! Cartoons – Teapot, Silkbone, Blind Man, Additional voices (also writer and producer, 1 episode)
 The Powerpuff Girls - Sandman
 Sister, Sister – Customer #1
 Grim & Evil – Grim, Sperg
 The Grim Adventures of Billy & Mandy – Grim, Sperg
 The Twisted Tales of Felix the Cat – Additional voices
 Where My Dogs At? – Additional voices
 Zombie College – Jamaican Zombie

Video games
 Star Warped – Additional voices
 Interstate '76 – Taurus 
 Metal Gear Solid – Gray Fox, Donald Anderson
 Fallout 2 – Sulik
 Interstate '76 Nitro Pack – Taurus
 Revenant – Ogro Mort, Yhagoro, Townsmen
 Interstate '82 – Taurus
 Star Trek: New Worlds – Additional voices
 Star Trek: Klingon Academy – Torlek
 Metal Gear Solid 2: Sons of Liberty – Peter Stillman (English dub)
 Star Trek: Armada II – Additional voices
 Eternal Darkness: Sanity's Requiem – Michael Edwards, Undead Guard, Chattur'gha
 Soldier of Fortune II: Double Helix – Cpl. William ‘Butch’ Abrams
 Wreckless: The Yakuza Missions – Police Captain (Uncredited)
 Dead to Rights – Preacherman Jones, Rafshoon Diggs
 Icewind Dale II – Additional voices
 Star Trek: Starfleet Command III – Commander Jureth
 Hunter: The Reckoning: Wayward – Joshua
 Hunter: The Reckoning: Redeemer – Additional voices
 Metal Gear Solid: The Twin Snakes – Donald Anderson (English dub)Role of Gray Fox replaced by Rob Paulsen
 EverQuest II – Additional voices
 Killer7 – Garcian Smith (English dub)
 Quake 4 – Sgt. Morris
 True Crime: New York City – Additional voices
 Saints Row – Stilwater’s Resident
 The Grim Adventures of Billy & Mandy – The Grim Reaper
 Marvel: Ultimate Alliance – Luke Cage, Super Skrull, Gorgon
 The Sopranos: Road to Respect – Additional voices
 Superman Returns – The Citizens of Metropolis
 The Shield – Det. Marques Hendryx
 Unreal Tournament 3 – Malcolm
 Crash of the Titans – Aku Aku 
 Crash: Mind over Mutant – Aku Aku 
 007: Quantum of Solace – Steven Obanno
 Madagascar 2 – Moto Moto
 Mercenaries 2: World in Flames – Blanco
 Cartoon Network Universe: FusionFall – The Grim Reaper
 Afro Samurai – Brother 6, Assassins, Rokutaro (English dub)
 Cartoon Network: Punch Time Explosion – The Grim Reaper
 Grand Theft Auto V – The Local Population
 Mortal Kombat X – Jax Briggs, Baraka
 XCOM 2 – US Soldier
 Mafia III – Additional voices
 Skylanders: Imaginators – Aku Aku
 Crash Bandicoot N. Sane Trilogy – Aku Aku
 Crash Team Racing Nitro-Fueled – Aku Aku 
 Crash Bandicoot 4: It's About Time – Aku Aku

Theme park attractions 
 The Eighth Voyage of Sindbad – Narrator

References

External links 
 
 

African-American male actors
American male television actors
American male video game actors
American male voice actors
Cartoon Network people
Living people
American male television writers
People from Milwaukee
American voice directors
1970 births
20th-century African-American people
21st-century African-American people
20th-century American male actors
21st-century American male actors